Nasa grandiflora is a species of plant in the family Loasaceae. It is endemic to the mountains of Peru, Ecuador, and Columbia.

Description

Range
Endemic to the Andes mountains of Peru, Ecuador, and Columbia between 3,100 and 3,500 masl.

Ecology

Etymology

Taxonomy

References

grandiflora